Cynosurus elegans is a species of grass in the genus Cynosurus. It is found in southern Europe, north Africa, Middle East and Turkmenistan.

References

External links 
 
 Picture on botanica-guy.blogspot.com (Spanish)
 Cynosurus elegans at eppo.int (EPPO code CYXEL)
 Cynosurus elegans at the International Plant Names Index (IPNI)

Pooideae
Plants described in 1798